Waterrock Knob is a mountain peak in the U.S. state of North Carolina. It is the highest peak in the Plott Balsams and is the 16th-highest mountain in the Eastern United States.

The mountain is a popular destination with tourists and amateur hikers, as it is easily accessible from the parkway. A visitors' center is located near its summit and a hiking trail leads to its top. The hiking trail and visitors' center are manned and maintained by the National Park Service, part of the United States Department of the Interior.

Name
Waterrock Knob is named as such because of a spring located near the summit where hunters would refill their canteens.

Geography

The mountain is split by both Haywood and Jackson counties in the western mountains of North Carolina. The mountain's summit is located within the Blue Ridge Parkway National Park Service unit.

Hiking
Waterrock Knob's summit can be accessed from the Waterrock Knob Visitor Center, located a milepost 451.2 on the Blue Ridge Parkway.

Images

See also
List of mountains in North Carolina

References

Mountains of North Carolina
Southern Sixers
Landmarks in North Carolina
Protected areas of Jackson County, North Carolina
Protected areas of Haywood County, North Carolina
Blue Ridge Parkway
Landforms of Jackson County, North Carolina
Mountains of Haywood County, North Carolina